The Central Michigan–Western Michigan football rivalry is an annual college football game between Central Michigan University (CMU) and Western Michigan University (WMU). The winner receives the Victory Cannon. In its first appearance, it was awarded to CMU at the conclusion of the October 18, 2008, game.

Victory Cannon
A cannon, which represents the cannons that are fired at both CMU's Kelly/Shorts Stadium and WMU's Waldo Stadium, sits atop the trophy and each of the schools' wins are noted on both sides.

Although the trophy was not awarded until 2008, the two teams first played one another in 1907.

Western Michigan ended the Chippewas five year winning streak with a 30-point win in 2011, and backed it up with a win in 2012, the Broncos' first win in Mount Pleasant since 2002. Although the Broncos lead the all-time series 52–39–2, since both teams began competing together in the NCAA Division I in 1975, Central Michigan leads the series 28–19–1. However, since the adoption of the Victory Cannon trophy, Western Michigan leads the series 9–6.

Game results

See also 
 List of NCAA college football rivalry games
 Michigan MAC Trophy

References

College football rivalries in the United States
Central Michigan Chippewas football
Western Michigan Broncos football
1907 establishments in Michigan